The 42nd Infantry Division (42ID) ("Rainbow") is a division of the United States Army National Guard. The 42nd Infantry Division has served in World War I, World War II and the Global War on Terrorism (GWOT). The division is currently headquartered at the Glenmore Road Armory in Troy, New York.

The division headquarters is a unit of the New York Army National Guard.  The division currently includes Army National Guard units from fourteen different states, including Connecticut, Maine, Maryland, Massachusetts, New Hampshire, New Jersey, New York, Rhode Island, and Vermont. , 67 percent of 42ID soldiers are located in New York and New Jersey.

Rainbow Division
When the United States declared war on Germany in 1917, it federalized the National Guard and formed their units into divisions to quickly build up an Army. In addition, Douglas MacArthur, then a major, suggested to William A. Mann, the head of the Militia Bureau, that he form another division from the units of several states that were not assigned to divisions. Secretary of War Newton D. Baker approved the proposal, and recalled Douglas MacArthur saying that such an organization would "stretch over the whole country like a rainbow." On 1 August 1917, the War Department directed the formation of a composite National Guard division, using units from 26 states and the District of Columbia. As a result, the 42nd Division came to be known as the "Rainbow Division". The name stuck, and MacArthur was promoted to colonel as the division chief of staff.

Rainbow unit insignia

The 42nd Division adopted a shoulder patch and distinctive unit insignia acknowledging the nickname. The original version of the patch symbolized a half arc rainbow and contained thin bands in multiple colors. During the latter part of World War I and post war occupation duty in Germany, the patch was changed to a quarter arc. According to the division's official history, Colonel William N. Hughes Jr., who had succeeded MacArthur as chief of staff, was credited with modifying the design to a quarter arc in an attempt to standardize it. Division lore includes the story that division commander Charles T. Menoher approved the patch after observing a rainbow shortly before a battle, deciding this was a favorable omen. According to World War I veterans of the 42nd Division, soldiers removed half the original symbol to memorialize the half of the division's soldiers who had been killed or wounded during the war. They also reduced the number of colors to just red, gold and blue bordered in green, to standardize the design and make the patch easier to reproduce.

Description: The 4th quadrant of a rainbow with three bands of color: red, gold and blue, each 3/8-inch (.95 cm) in width, outer radius 2 inches (5.08 cm); all within a 1/8-inch (.32 cm) Army green border.

Background: The shoulder sleeve insignia was originally authorized by telegram on 29 October 1918. It was officially authorized for wear on 27 May 1922. It was reauthorized for wear when the division was reactivated for World War II. On 8 September 1947, it was authorized for the post-World War II 42nd Infantry Division when it was reactivated as a National Guard unit.

World War I
 

The 42nd Division was assembled in August 1917 at Camp Mills, New York, four months after the American entry into World War I. The 42nd arrived overseas to the Western Front of Belgium and France in November 1917, one of the first divisions of the American Expeditionary Force (AEF) to do so, under the command of Major General William A. Mann although he was soon to be replaced by Major General Charles T. Menoher, who remained in this position for the rest of the war. Colonel Douglas MacArthur was the division's chief of staff until he later went on to command the 84th Brigade of the division. The AEF was commanded by General John Joseph Pershing. After initially landing at St. Nazaire (France), the 42nd was temporarily located at Vaucouleurs, Lorraine (France), from 7 November – 7 December 1917, to preliminarily train before transferring to another training area between Lafauche and Rimaucourt. The day after Christmas, the 42nd, along with other divisions it had now linked up with, departed for another training area near Rolampont, Langres (France). French officers had been attached to the 42nd at Lafauche, Rimaucourt, and Rolampont as instructors in trench warfare who "...seemed, from Menoher and MacArthur's view, to think more highly of the Rainbow's performance than did Pershing and his Chaumont staff".

"On February 13, 1918, the day that the [3-day] inspection [by General Pershing's headquarter's staff from Chaumont] was completed, Pershing ordered the 42nd division to move to the Lunéville sector of southern Lorraine for a month's training at the front with the French VII Corps". "Rainbow division entrained for the Lunéville sector on February 16, 1918, and it was joined by the 67th Field Artillery Brigade shortly thereafter. Rainbow's soldiers were distributed over the entire sixteen-mile front of the sector, from Lunéville past St. Clément to Baccarat. As far as administration, supply, and discipline were concerned, the division was part of MG Hunter Liggett's I Corps, A.E.F., but for combat and training purposes it was under Major General Georges de Bazelaire, of the French VII Army Corps, with each of the 42nd's Regiments assigned to one of the French Divisions holding the sector. Each American battalion served one week at a time on the front line, then spent the next week on the second line of defense, and the third week in reserve Acute Shortages of some types of equipment still existed, as evidenced, for example, by Menoher's order that troops of a battalion leaving the front line were to yield their Pistols to the men of the relieving battalion".

On 16 June 1918, General Pershing ordered the 42nd to entrain to "the Champagne region east of Rheims (a sector comparatively more active than Baccarat) to be assigned to General Henri Gouraud's Fourth Army"; relinquishing the current Baccarat sector "to the relieving American 77th and French 61st divisions". 

During 1918, Rainbow division, specifically with the 67th Field Artillery's "1650 projectiles" in the Bois des Chiens, engaged German forces with and experienced bombardment by German forces with deadly, poison-gas Bombardments, specifically with German 75-mm. and 105-mm. shells filled with palite and yperite (also known as Mustard gas). The 42nd took part in four major operations: the Champagne-Marne, the Aisne-Marne, the Battle of Saint-Mihiel, and the Meuse-Argonne Offensive. In total, it saw 264 days of combat.

Casualties: total 14,683 (KIA – 2,058; WIA – 12,625).
Commanders: MG W. A. Mann (5 September 1917), Brig. Gen. Charles T. Menoher (19 December 1917), Maj. Gen. Charles D. Rhodes, (7 November 1918), Brig. Gen. Douglas MacArthur (10 November 1918), Maj. Gen. C. A. F. Flagler (22 November 1918), Brig. Gen. George G. Gatley (28 March 1919), Maj. Gen. George Windle Read (10 April 1919 to Division's deactivation on 9 May 1919).

The 42nd Division was demobilized in May 1919 at Camp Upton, New York, Camp Grant, Illinois, Camp Dix, New Jersey, and Camp Dodge, Iowa.

Order of battle
 Headquarters, 42nd Division (future General of the Army, then Colonel Douglas MacArthur, served as the chief of staff of the 42nd Division)
 83rd Infantry Brigade
165th Infantry Regiment (formerly 69th Infantry, New York National Guard)
Notable members: Major William "Wild Bill" Donovan, Chaplain Francis P. Duffy, Sergeant Joyce Kilmer
Significant events: Rouge Bouquet
166th Infantry Regiment (formerly 4th Infantry, Ohio National Guard)
 150th Machine Gun Battalion (formerly Companies E, F, and G, 2nd Infantry, Wisconsin National Guard)
 84th Infantry Brigade (this was the brigade that Brigadier General Douglas MacArthur commanded from July 1918 to November 1918)
167th Infantry Regiment (formerly 4th Infantry, Alabama National Guard)
168th Infantry Regiment (formerly 3rd Infantry, Iowa National Guard)
 151st Machine Gun Battalion (formerly Companies B, C, and F, 2nd Infantry, Georgia National Guard)
 67th Field Artillery Brigade
 149th Field Artillery Regiment (75 mm) (formerly 1st Field Artillery, Illinois National Guard)
150th Field Artillery Regiment (155 mm) (formerly 1st Field Artillery, Indiana National Guard)
 151st Field Artillery Regiment (75 mm) (formerly 1st Field Artillery, Minnesota National Guard)
 117th Trench Mortar Battery (formerly 3rd and 4th Companies, Coast Artillery, Maryland National Guard)
 149th Machine Gun Battalion (formerly 3rd Battalion, 4th Infantry, Pennsylvania National Guard)
 117th Engineer Regiment (formerly Separate Battalions, Engineers, California and South Carolina National Guards)
 117th Field Signal Battalion (formerly 1st Battalion, Signal Corps, Missouri National Guard)
 Headquarters Troop, 42nd Division (formerly 1st Separate Troop, Cavalry, Louisiana National Guard)
 117th Train Headquarters and Military Police (formerly 1st and 2nd Companies, Coast Artillery, Virginia National Guard)
 117th Ammunition Train (formerly 1st Ammunition Train, Kansas National Guard)
 117th Supply Train (formerly Supply Train, Texas National Guard)
 117th Engineer Train (formerly Engineer Train, North Carolina National Guard)
 117th Sanitary Train (165th–168th Ambulance Companies and Field Hospitals)
 165th Ambulance Company (formerly 1st Ambulance Company, Michigan National Guard)
 165th Field Hospital (formerly 1st Field Hospital, Washington, D.C. National Guard)
 166th Ambulance Company (formerly 1st Ambulance Company, New Jersey National Guard)
 166th Field Hospital (formerly 1st Field Hospital, Nebraska National Guard)
 167th Ambulance Company (formerly 1st Ambulance Company, Tennessee National Guard)
 167th Field Hospital (formerly 1st Field Hospital, Oregon National Guard)
 168th Ambulance Company (formerly 1st Ambulance Company, Oklahoma National Guard)
 168th Field Hospital (formerly 1st Field Hospital, Colorado National Guard

Interwar period

As the 42nd was a composite division, it was not contemplated for reorganization after World War I, and all of its former elements were assigned to other National Guard divisions or remained demobilized.

World War II
Activated: 14 July 1943
Overseas: November 1944.
Campaigns:  Ardennes-Alsace, Rhineland, Central Europe.
Days of combat: 106.
Prisoners of war taken: 59,128.
Presidential Unit Citation: 2.
Awards: MH-1 ; DSC-4 ; DSM-1 ; SS-622; LM-9; SM-32; ; BSM-5,325 ; AM-104.
Commanders: Maj. Gen. Harry J. Collins commanded the 42ID during its entire period of federal service in World War II.
Deactivated: 29 June 1946 in Europe.

Order of battle
 Headquarters, 42nd Infantry Division
 222nd Infantry Regiment
 232nd Infantry Regiment
 242nd Infantry Regiment
 Headquarters and Headquarters Battery, 42nd Infantry Division Artillery
 232nd Field Artillery Battalion (105 mm)
 392nd Field Artillery Battalion (105 mm)
 402nd Field Artillery Battalion (105 mm)
 542nd Field Artillery Battalion (155 mm)
 142nd Engineer Combat Battalion
 122nd Medical Battalion
 42nd Cavalry Reconnaissance Troop (Mechanized)
 Headquarters, Special Troops, 42nd Infantry Division
 Headquarters Company, 42nd Infantry Division
 742nd Ordnance Light Maintenance Company
 42nd Quartermaster Company
 132nd Signal Company
 Military Police Platoon
 Band
 42nd Counterintelligence Corps Detachment

Combat chronicle
When activated for World War II, the 42ID was a unique unit, as it was a reconstitution of the Rainbow Division from World War I. Army Ground Forces filled the division with personnel from every state, and from the division’s standup at Camp Gruber until the division stood down in Austria, at every formal assembly, the division displayed not only the national and divisional colors, but all 48 state colors (state flags). To emphasize the 42ID’s continued lineage from the 42ID of World War I, Maj. Gen. Harry J. Collins activated the unit on 14 July, the eve of the twenty-fifth anniversary of the Champagne-Marne campaign in France.

Following training at Camp Gruber, Oklahoma and the journey to Europe, the three infantry regiments (222nd, 232nd, & 242nd) and a detachment of the 42ID Headquarters arrived in France at Marseille, 8–9 December 1944, and were formed into Task Force (TF) Linden, under Henning Linden, the Assistant Division Commander (ADC). As part of the Seventh Army's VI Corps, TF Linden entered combat in the vicinity of Strasbourg, relieving elements of the 36ID on 24 December 1944.

While defending on a 31-mile sector along the Rhine north and south of Strasbourg in January 1945, TF Linden repulsed a number of enemy counterattacks at Hatten and other locations during the German "Operation Northwind" offensive. At the headquarters of 1st Battalion, 242nd Infantry, Private First Class Vito R. Bertoldo waged a 48-hour defense of the battalion command post, for which he received the Medal of Honor. When the command post was attacked by a German tank with its 88-mm. gun and machine gun fire, Bertoldo remained at his post, and with his own machine gun killed the occupants of the tank when they tried to remove mines which were blocking their advance. On 24 and 25 January 1945, in the Bois D’Ohlungen, and the vicinity of Schweighouse-sur-Moder and Neubourg, the 222nd Infantry Regiment held a position covering a front of 7,500 yards, three times the normal frontage for a regiment in defense. After a two-hour artillery bombardment, the 222nd Infantry Regiment was repeatedly attacked by elements of the German 7th Parachute, 47th Volks Grenadier Division, and the 25th Panzer Grenadier Division. During the ensuing struggle, one company of the 222nd Infantry was surrounded, but withdrew from their position and infiltrated back through the Germans to the regimental lines after exhausting all but 35 rounds of ammunition. For 24 hours, the battle raged, but the Germans were never able to break through the 222nd lines. For this action the 222nd Infantry Regiment was awarded the Presidential Unit Citation (2001). After these enemy attacks, TF Linden returned to reserve of the 7th Army and trained with the remainder of the 42ID which had arrived in the meantime.

On 14 February 1945, the 42ID as a whole entered combat, taking up defensive positions near Haguenau in the Hardt Forest. After a month of extensive patrolling and active defense, the 42ID went on the offensive. On the night of 27 February the Germans laid down a heavy concentration of artillery and mortar fire and under this the elements of the 6th Mountain Division were withdrawn and replaced by the 221st Volksgrenadier Regiment.

In the brief period this unit had been in the line, German soldiers had come to respect the Rainbow and fear its patrols and raids. "Is your Division a part of Roosevelt's SS?" asked one German when captured. The remark was passed along and men kidded each other about being in the Rainbow SS. The 42ID attacked through the Hardt Forest, broke through the Siegfried Line, 15–21 March 1945, cleared Dahn and Busenberg, and mopped up in that general area, while the 3rd Army created and expanded bridgeheads across the Rhine. Moving across the Rhine, 31 March 1945, the 42ID captured Wertheim am Main, 1 April 1945, and Würzburg, 2–6 April 1945, after a fierce battle. Schweinfurt fell next after hand-to-hand engagements, 9–12 April 1945. Fürth, near Nuremberg, put up fanatical resistance, but was taken, 18–19 April 1945, by the 42ID.

42ID's patrol arrested German war criminal Arthur Greiser. Greiser surrendered with Waffen-SS officer Heinz Reinefarth.

On 25 April, the 42ID captured Donauwörth on the Danube, and, on 29 April 1945, liberated some 30,000 inmates at Dachau concentration camp.

Casualties
Total battle casualties: 3,971
Killed in action: 553
Wounded in action: 2,212
Missing in action: 31
Prisoner of war: 1,175

Assignments in ETO
10 December 1944: Seventh Army, 6th Army Group
15 December 1944: Third Army, 12th Army Group
24 December 1944: VI Corps, Seventh Army, 6th Army Group
25 March 1945: XXI Corps, Seventh Army, 6th Army Group
19 April 1945: XV Corps, Seventh Army, 6th Army Group

The 42nd Division ended World War II on occupation duty in Austria and was inactivated by the end of January 1947.

Cold War
On 13 October 1945, the War Department published a postwar policy statement for the entire Army. After the policy statement was published, the Army Staff prepared a postwar National Guard troop basis, which included twenty-four divisions, including the 42nd Infantry Division. Most soldiers considered the 42nd, initially organized with state troops in 1917, as a Guard formation. During the process, New York successfully petitioned the War Department for the 42nd Infantry Division. After the state governors formally notified the National Guard Bureau that they accepted the new troop allotments, the bureau authorized reorganization of the units with 100 percent of their officers and 80 percent of their enlisted personnel. By September 1947, the 42nd Division headquarters, along with all the other new Guard divisional headquarters, had received federal recognition.

In April 1963, the 42nd Division was reorganized under the Reorganization Objective Army Division structure. From 1967 to 1969, the division was briefly part of the Selected Reserve Force, designed to reinforce the active army in Vietnam. In a 1968 reorganization, the division was split between the New York Army National Guard and the Pennsylvania Army National Guard. In 1973–74, the division was converted back into an all-New York organization.

The 42nd Infantry Division absorbed the units of the 26th Infantry Division and the 50th Armored Division of the Massachusetts and New Jersey Army National Guard, respectively, in post-Cold War restructuring. All three divisions were severely understrength, so the assets of the three were combined into one. The 50th Brigade, created from the assets of the disbanding 50th Armored Division, was initially assigned to the 42nd Infantry Division as an armored brigade, but was transformed to an infantry brigade combat team (BCT) in the very first years of the 21st century as part of Army modularity.

In the 1970s, the division headquarters was located at the armory at 125 West 14th Street in Manhattan. It was relocated in December 1989 to the Glenmore Armory in Troy, New York and remains there to this day.

Global War on Terrorism
Since the 11 September attacks, the 42ID has been extensively involved in the war on terrorism, in both homeland security (HLS) and expeditionary operations. The 42ID's 1–101st Cavalry led the New York Army National Guard's efforts and provided security at Ground Zero during the rescue and then recovery efforts there. 42ID units from the New Jersey Army National Guard provided security at all the major river crossings into New York City and Newark International Airport in the months following 11 September 2001.

The first major overseas effort of the 42ID was the deployment of elements of the 50th BCT/42ID to Guantanamo Bay Naval Base, Cuba. The 2–102nd Armor Battalion deployed as ILO MP's and served with the Joint Detention Operation Group in the detention facility. The 2nd Battalion, 113th Infantry deployed to Guantanamo Bay as well and provided security for the Joint Task Force at Camp Delta. While there elements of the 2nd Battalion, 102nd Armor supported the first military tribunals held at the Guantanamo Bay Detention Facility. Elements have also deployed to the Horn of Africa and Djibouti. New Jersey's 3/112th Field Artillery and 5/117th Cavalry deployed as an ILO Military Police Company with 89th MP Brigade/759th Military Police Battalion; served in Sadr City, and worked alongside the First Cavalry Division. Stationed out of Camp Cuervo (Al Rustimayah) in Baghdad, platoons also worked with U.S. Marines in Fallujah. On 4 June 2004, SSG Carvill and SGT Duffy were killed and the following day the unit lost SPC Doltz and SSG Timoteo.

The 2/108th Infantry deployed to Iraq in 2004. In 2004–05, the 1/69 Infantry served in Iraq, eventually providing security on the Baghdad International Airport (BIAP) Road. The 42nd Combat Aviation Brigade also deployed to Iraq during this period.

In 2004, the division headquarters and division troops of the 42nd Infantry Division deployed as part of Operation Iraqi Freedom (OIF) III, relieving the 1st Infantry Division (1ID). The division controlled the north-central Iraq area of operations. Serving as the command and control (C2) of Task Force Liberty, the 42ID took over responsibility for the area known as Multi-National Division North Central (MND-NC) including the provinces of Saladin, Diyala, At Ta'amim (Kirkuk) and As Sulymaniah from the 1st Infantry Division on 14 February 2005. The 42ID directed the operations of: 1st BCT, 3ID; 3rd BCT, 3ID; the 278th RCT; 3rd- 313rd Field Artillery, 56th BCT (Texas Army National Guard); and the 116th Cavalry Brigade Combat Team (Idaho, Oregon, and Montana Army National Guard). Soldiers conducted combat actions and raids, seized weapons caches, destroyed improvised explosive devices (IEDs), trained Iraqi army forces, and worked on reconstruction to ensure free elections. 1–69th Infantry of the 42ID manned the checkpoint where Italian SISMI officer Nicola Calipari was shot and killed.

Maj. Gen. Joseph J. Taluto, commanding general of the division during its deployment, commended the many contributions of the 42ID led Task Force Liberty. Vice Chief of Staff of the Army (VCSA), Gen. Richard Cody, saluted members of the 42ID at the unit's homecoming ceremony. The division's Headquarters and Headquarters Company was awarded the Army Meritorious Unit Commendation for its service in Iraq.

In 2008, 26 company-sized elements of the 50th Infantry Brigade Combat Team (IBCT), headquartered at Fort Dix, New Jersey, deployed to Iraq bringing the total number of NJ National Guard soldiers sent to Iraq and Afghanistan to over 3,200. These elements of the 50th IBCT were mobilized for one year, including stateside training and "boots on the ground" in theater. Premobilization training began in 2007 and took place in New Jersey, with further OIF specific preparation conducted at other Army installations out-of-state. Originally slated to deploy to Iraq in 2010, these elements deployed earlier as a result of changes needed to comply with new Department of Defense (DoD) policies. Earlier, in 2007, the DoD had reduced the amount of time units spend overseas in a combat theater, which in turn shifted mobilization schedules and required earlier deployments than anticipated. Elements of the 50th IBCT had deployed in support of Operation Iraqi Freedom (OIF) previously in 2004.

In 2008, the 27th Infantry Brigade Combat Team (IBCT), headquartered in Syracuse, New York, was mobilized and deployed to Afghanistan to train Afghan National Army (ANA) and police forces. Initial personnel from the 27th IBCT deployed in late 2007, with the majority of the approximately 1,700 service members deployed by mid-2008.

In conjunction around February 2008, soldiers of the 86th Infantry Brigade Combat Team were beginning to receive notification of their upcoming deployment. The Brigade Commander at the time was Colonel William F. Roy. In 2009, the brigade did a rotation at JRTC in Fort Polk, LA. In December 2009, the brigade was officially mobilized and to report to Camp Atterbury, IN. While in Indiana, the brigade trained and prepped for their future deployment to Afghanistan. After receiving numerous replacements and volunteer soldiers, the brigade was sent back to JRTC for one more rotation before they left the country.

The majority of the brigade landed in Afghanistan in early March. The brigade headquarters was on Bagram Airfield in RC-East. The brigade was tasked with numerous missions across eastern Afghanistan. The missions included partnering with the Afghan National Security Forces (ANSF), assisting in the Government of the Islamic Republic of Afghanistan, and securing over 30,000 soldiers on Bagram Airfield while ensuring the base was continuing its daily operations. The brigade left Afghanistan in early December returning to Camp Atterbury, IN. The brigade was released from federal service and returned to the northeast to continue their respective state missions. Several component units of the brigade were awarded the Meritorious Unit Commendation for their service from 8 March 2010 – 4 December 2010 while deployed in support of Operation Enduring Freedom.

Deaths of Esposito and Allen

Captain Phillip Esposito and First Lieutenant Louis Allen were killed on 7 June 2005, at Forward Operating Base Danger in Tikrit, Iraq by a M18A1 Claymore mine placed in the window of Esposito's office. Esposito was commander, Headquarters and Headquarters Company, 42ID. Allen had recently arrived in Iraq to serve as Esposito's executive officer, or second in command.

Military investigators determined that the mine was deliberately placed and detonated with the intention of killing Esposito and Allen. Staff Sergeant Alberto B. Martinez from the officers' unit was charged in the killing but was acquitted in a court-martial trial at Fort Bragg, North Carolina, on 4 December 2008. The case was one of only two publicly announced alleged fragging incidents among U.S. forces during the Iraq War.

Subsequently, Siobhan Esposito and Barbara Allen, the widows of the officers, continued to pursue justice for their husbands' deaths, pushing for the military to strictly enforce regulations that prohibit threats against superiors and require soldiers to report violations of "good order and discipline."

Homeland security
During the Cold War and through the present, the 42ID and its soldiers have been regularly called upon for homeland security missions including disaster relief (such as Hurricane Katrina, Hurricane Floyd), emergency preparedness (such as Y2K missions), airport security, critical infrastructure protection, border security, bridge and tunnel security, as well as rail/train station security.

Several first responders to the 11 September 2001 attacks were members of the 42ID, and led much of the military support to the relief and recovery efforts. The 42ID was part of the relief team for the duration of the effort at Ground Zero in New York City. The 42ID has also been actively engaged in missions supporting Operation Noble Eagle.

In October 2005, elements of the 50th Armored Brigade/42 ID were activated for Operation Hurricane Katrina relief in the city of New Orleans. The 2–102nd Armor and the 1–114th Infantry were called to active duty and the combined unit was dispatched to Louisiana to provide security for FEMA. The 50th Brigade arrived at Belle Chase Naval Air Station and from there went to the New Orleans Convention Center. From there, the elements of the 42nd ID sent teams to various parts of the city on various missions of security ranging from roving patrol to security escort for the New Orleans Fire Department and other relief agencies

Current structure

 42nd Infantry Division exercises training and readiness oversight of the following units, but they are not organic: There is a division level special troops battalion, three infantry brigade combat teams, a combat aviation brigade and an attached maneuver enhancement brigade as well as a field artillery brigade along with a sustainment brigade.
  Special Troops Battalion, 42nd Infantry Division
  27th Infantry Brigade Combat Team (IBCT) (NY NG)
Headquarters and Headquarters Company (HHC)
  2nd Squadron, 101st Cavalry Regiment (Reconnaissance Surveillance and Target Acquisition (RSTA))
  1st Battalion, 69th Infantry Regiment
  2nd Battalion, 108th Infantry Regiment
  1st Battalion, 182nd Infantry Regiment (MA NG)
  1st Battalion, 258th Field Artillery Regiment (FAR)
 152nd Brigade Engineer Battalion (BEB) 
 427th Brigade Support Battalion (BSB)
  44th IBCT (NJ NG)
HHC
  1st Squadron, 102nd Cavalry Regiment (RSTA)
  2nd Battalion, 113th Infantry Regiment
  1st Battalion, 114th Infantry Regiment
  1st Battalion, 181st Infantry Regiment (MA NG)
  3rd Battalion, 112th FAR
 104th BEB
 250th BSB
 86th IBCT (Mountain) (VT NG)
 HHC
 1st Squadron, 172nd Cavalry Regiment (RSTA)
 1st Battalion, 102nd Infantry Regiment (Mountain) (CT NG)
 1st Battalion, 157th Infantry Regiment (Mountain) (CO NG)
 3rd Battalion, 172nd Infantry Regiment (Mountain) (VT NG & NH NG & ME NG)
 1st Battalion, 101st FAR (MA NG & VT NG)
 572nd BEB
 186th BSB
 Combat Aviation Brigade, 42d Infantry Division (CAB) (NY NG)
 HHC
  3rd Battalion (General Support), 126th Aviation Regiment (MA NG & VT NG & MD NG)
  1st Battalion (Attack/Recon), 151st Aviation Regiment
  3rd Battalion (Assault), 142nd Aviation Regiment
 642nd Aviation Support Battalion

Attached units
  26th Maneuver Enhancement Brigade (MA ARNG)
  HHC
  Network Signal Company
  197th Field Artillery Brigade (NH ARNG)
  Headquarters and Headquarters Battery
  3rd Battalion, 197th FAR (High Mobility Artillery Rocket System (HIMARS)) (NH NG)
  1st Battalion, 103rd FAR (M777A2 Howitzer) (RI NG) (aligned with 197th Field Artillery Brigade (FAB))
  1st Battalion, 109th FAR (M109A6 Paladin) (PA NG) (aligned with 197th FAB)
  1st Battalion, 119th FAR (M777A2 Howitzer) (MI NG) (aligned with 197th FAB)
  1st Battalion, 182nd FAR (HIMARS) (MI NG) (aligned with 197th FAB)
  1st Battalion, 201st FAR (M109A6 Paladin) (WV NG) (aligned with 197th FAB)
  3643rd BSB (NH NG)
  Battery E, 197th FAR (NH NG)
 372nd Signal Company (NH NG)
  369th Sustainment Brigade

Note: Security and support (S&S) battalions are used in homeland security and drug interdiction roles. These units are currently not to be deployed outside the United States. S&S battalions are placed under a combat aviation brigade for organizational purposes.

Commanders of the 42nd Infantry Division

Notable former members

Robert Galbraith Allison, World War I, director of the budget, state of Tennessee
Vito Bertoldo, World War II, Medal of Honor
Boris Bittker, World War II, law professor
George Emerson Brewer, World War I, surgeon
Joseph W. Brooks, World War I, college football coach
Wilber M. Brucker, World War I, United States Secretary of the Army
Robert Burns, World War II, member of the Iowa Senate
Frank Merrill Caldwell, World War I, 83rd Infantry Brigade commander
Kenneth John Conant, World War I, architectural historian
Hamilton Corbett, World War I, college football player and businessman
Scott Corbett, World War II, journalist and author
W. Arthur Cunningham, World War I, New York City Comptroller
Roger W. Cutler Jr., World War II, athlete, attorney and banker
Reginald B. DeLacour, World War I, adjutant general of Connecticut
John L. DeWitt, World War I, U.S. Army four-star general
Michael A. Donaldson, World War I, Medal of Honor
William J. Donovan, World War I, Medal of Honor
Francis P. Duffy, World War I, Catholic priest and army chaplain
Francis J. Evon, Jr., Operation Enduring Freedom, Connecticut Adjutant General
Samuel Warren Hamilton, World War I, psychiatrist
Thomas S. Hammond, World War I, business executive
Thomas T. Handy, World War I, U.S. Army four-star general
Thomas Francis Hickey, World War II, U.S. Army lieutenant general
Lisa J. Hou, Operation Iraqi Freedom, Adjutant general of the New Jersey National Guard
Benson W. Hough, World War I, judge of the United States District Court for the Southern District of Ohio
Kevin Interdonato, Operation Iraqi Freedom, actor
Olin D. Johnston, World War I, U.S. senator
Louis Jordan, World War I, college football player
Joyce Kilmer, World War I, journalist and poet
Rory Lancman, Cold War, member of the New York State Assembly and New York City Council
Bruce M. Lawlor, Global War on Terrorism, U.S. Army major general
George E. Leach, World War I, mayor of Minneapolis
Michael Joseph Lenihan, World War I, 83rd Brigade commander
Ralph Linton, World War I, anthropologist
Charles MacArthur, World War I, author
Sidney E. Manning, World War I, Medal of Honor
Jeff W. Mathis III, Cold War, U.S. Army major general
Moose McCormick, World War I, professional baseball player, director of the United States Army Air Forces during World War II
Thomas C. Neibaur, World War I, Medal of Honor
Donald A. Quarles, World War I, United States Deputy Secretary of Defense
Richard W. O'Neill, World War I, Medal of Honor
Todd Pillion, Operation Iraqi Freedom, member of the Senate of Virginia
B. Carroll Reece, World War I, U.S. congressman
Henry J. Reilly, World War I, author and journalist
Louis W. Ross, World War I, architect
Richard J. Tallman, World War II, U.S. Army brigadier general
John C. F. Tillson, World War II, U.S. Army major general
Robert Tyndall, World War I, mayor of Indianapolis
James Ronald Warren, World War II, Historian
Emmett Watson, World War I, illustrator
Arthur Whittemore, World War I, associate justice of the Massachusetts Supreme Judicial Court

In popular culture
The soldiers who provide security around the ghost-contaminated apartment building in the 1984 film Ghostbusters wear the uniform of the 42nd Infantry Division. The 42nd Infantry Division was featured in the 2008 monster film Cloverfield.

See also
Army National Guard
Battle of the Bulge
United States National Guard

References

Sources
The Army Almanac: A Book of Facts Concerning the Army of the United States U.S. Government Printing Office, 1950 reproduced at the United States Army Center of Military History.
James J. Cooke, The Rainbow Division in the Great War, 1917–1919, Greenwood Publishing Group, Incorporated 1994

External links

 42nd Division homepage
 Rosedale Arch dedicated to the Rainbow Division in WWI
  Rainbow Memories; Character Sketches of the 1st Battalion 166th Infantry Regiment
 www.historynet.com – 42nd Division in Alsace
 www.lonesentry.com – 42nd Division history
 

042nd Infantry Division, U.S.
Infantry Division, U.S. 042
Divisions of the United States Army National Guard
United States Army divisions of World War I
Infantry divisions of the United States Army in World War II
Military units and formations in New York (state)
Military units and formations established in 1917
Military units and formations in Massachusetts